Flying Pigs is a 2010 Polish drama film directed by Anna Kazejak-Dawid. It premiered on 5 November 2010 in Poland.

Plot 
The story of a group of friends from a small town near Poznań, Grodzisk Wielkopolski, who shared a common passion: football, or rather "active support for a football club". They are connected by a club, divided by a life situation. Oskar Nowacki (35) just became a father. Together with his brother Mariusz (25), he sells religious items in the Basilica in Licheń. Mariusz's girlfriend, Basia (22), accompanies the boys because of their love of support and remnants of attachment to Mariusz, but above all because of their fascination with Oskar.

Cast 
 Paweł Małaszyński as Oskar
 Olga Bołądź as Basia
 Piotr Rogucki as Mariusz
 Karolina Gorczyca as Alina
 Cezary Pazura as Krzysztof Dzikowski
 Agata Kulesza as Karina Klaus
 Andrzej Grabowski as Pan Edzio
 Eryk Lubos as "Moher"
 Witold Dębicki as Jan
 Anna Romantowska as Janicka
 Przemysław Saleta as Bodyguard
 Dariusz Biskupski as Bodyguard
 Dorota Zięciowska as Oskar's Mother
 Dominik Bąk as "Żarówa"
 Roman Gancarczyk as Priest
 Bartłomiej Firlet as "Pała".

References

External links

Flying Pigs on Cineuropa

2010 films
Polish drama films
2010 drama films